The Magic Roundabout is an English-language children's television programme that ran from 1965 to 1977. It used the footage of the French stop motion animation show Le Manège enchanté but with completely different scripts and characters.

The French series, created by Serge Danot with the help of Ivor Wood and Wood's French wife, Josiane, was broadcast from 1964 to 1974 on ORTF (Office de Radiodiffusion Télévision Française). The BBC originally rejected translating the series because it was "charming... but difficult to dub into English", but later produced a version of the series using the French footage with new English-language scripts unrelated to the original storylines. This version, written and told by Eric Thompson, was broadcast in 441 five-minute episodes between 18 October 1965 and 25 January 1977. It proved a great success and attained cult status, and when in October 1966 it was moved from the slot just before the evening news to an earlier children's viewing time, adult viewers complained to the BBC.

A new version is being made by Method Animation, targeted for 2024, that will try to "find a balance between the French and English contexts".

Characters
Although the characters are common to both versions, they were given different names and personalities depending on the language.

The main character is Dougal (also known as Doogal) (Pollux in the original French-language version), who was a drop-eared variety of the Skye Terrier.

Other characters include Zebedee (Zébulon), a talking jack-in-the-box with magical powers; Brian (Ambroise), a snail; Ermintrude (Azalée), a cow; and Dylan (named after Bob Dylan) (Flappy), a hippy rabbit. There are two notable human characters: Florence (Margote), a young girl; and Mr Rusty (le Père Pivoine), the elderly moustached operator of the roundabout.

Other characters included Mr McHenry (Bonhomme Jouvence, the elderly gardener who rode a tricycle), and a talking locomotive with a 4-2-2 wheel arrangement and a two-wheel tender. Three other children, Paul, Basil and Rosalie, appeared in the original black-and-white serial and in the credit sequence of the colour episodes, but very rarely in subsequent episodes.

Dougal, Brian, Ermintrude and Dylan all reside in a place called The Magic Garden (Beautywood in the US version). The exact distance from where the roundabout and The Magic Garden are in relation to each other was never specifically stated, but, given Zebedee and Florence would always travel there by magical teleportation, it was either considerably far away or it was simply faster to get there by those means.

The show has a distinctive visual style. The set is a brightly coloured and stylised park containing the eponymous roundabout (a fairground carousel). The programmes were created by stop motion animation, which meant that Dougal was made without legs to make him easier to animate. Zebedee was created from a giant pea which was available in the animation studio and was re-painted. The look of these characters was the responsibility of British animator Ivor Wood, who was working at Danot's studio at the time (and who subsequently animated The Herbs, Paddington Bear, Postman Pat, Gran and Bertha).

English-language version
Narration in the British BBC version was entirely new and bears no resemblance to the French version. It was created by Eric Thompson from just the visuals, without any translation of the French scripts by Serge Danot.

The first British broadcasts were shown every weekday on BBC1 at 17:50, just before the early-evening news at 17:55. Although the exact time of the early evening news varied over the years, The Magic Roundabout kept its slot before the bulletins for the duration of its original broadcasting, except for 16:55 time slots during October to November 1966, and earlier times during parts of 1972 and 1973. This was the first time an entertainment programme had been transmitted in this way in the UK. The original series, which was a serial, was made in black and white. From the second series onwards it was made in colour, but the series was still broadcast in black and white by the BBC; the first colour episode of the show ("Chocolate Soldiers") was transmitted on 5 October 1970.

52 additional episodes, claimed to have been not previously broadcast, were shown in the United Kingdom from January to March 1992 on Channel 4's "The Channel Four Daily". Thompson had died by this time, and the job of narrating them in a pastiche of Thompson's style went to actor Nigel Planer. These episodes actually had been previously narrated by Thompson (particularly from the 1970-1971 series), being redubbed editions of the original French colour episodes by AB Productions (with different music and slightly different voices) broadcast in 1990. An additional 43 episodes were narrated by Planer from April to September 1993, this time, with most of the episodes coming from a batch of new French episodes broadcast during that same year up until 1995.

The English version of Dougal was generally disparaging and had similarities with the television character of Tony Hancock, an actor and comedian. Ermintrude was rather matronly and fond of singing. Dylan was a hippy-like, guitar-playing rabbit, and rather dopey. Florence was portrayed as courteous and level-headed. Brian was unsophisticated but well-meaning.

Part of the show's attraction was that it appealed to adults, who enjoyed the world-weary Hancock-style comments made by Dougal, as well as to children. The audience measured eight million at its peak. There are speculations about possible interpretations of the show. One is that the characters represented French politicians of the time, and that Dougal represented Charles de Gaulle. In fact, when Serge Danot was interviewed by Joan Bakewell on Late Night Line-Up in 1968 his associate (perhaps Jean Biard) said that in France it was thought at first that the UK version of Pollux had been renamed "De Gaulle", mishearing the name Dougal (as seen in the Channel 4 documentary The Return of the Magic Roundabout (broadcast 08:50 on 25 December 1991 and 18:00 on 5 January 1992), and in the 2003 BBC4 documentary The Magic Roundabout Story).

Sometimes, the series broke the fourth wall. At the end of one episode, "A Peaceful Day", when Zebedee called his catchphrase of "Time for bed", Florence asked "Already?", and Zebedee replied that "It's nearly time for the news, and you've had enough magic for one day". The news was broadcast just after The Magic Roundabout. This story was later republished in print from Bloomsbury's 1998 book The Adventures of Brian.

In 1971 Brockhampton Press, under their paperback imprint Knight Books, published two books written by Eric Thompson, The Adventures of Dougal and Dougal's Scottish Holiday. These were original stories written by Thompson using the characters, and not versions of scripts from the series.

In 1998, Thompson's stories were published by Bloomsbury Publishing Plc as a series of four paperbacks, The Adventures of Dougal, The Adventures of Brian, The Adventures of Dylan and The Adventures of Ermintrude with forewords by his daughter Emma Thompson. While The Adventures of Dougal featured republications of three exclusive book stories, the latter three featured scripts from the TV series. She explains that her father had felt that he was most like Brian of all the characters and that Ermintrude was in some respects based upon his wife, Phyllida Law.

For years, the series had re-runs on Cartoon Network, and was later moved to its sister channel, Boomerang. These airings mainly used episodes from the 1974 series, which have been re-narrated by Jimmy Hibbert (who, unlike the previous British dubs, actually translated the French scripts, though not entirely verbatim), though some episodes from the Nigel Planer dub aired as well.

Foreign-language versions
 In Italy, the series was known as "La Giostra Incantata" ("The Enchanted Carousel") and part of the series was broadcast in the 1970s by the RAI state television network. In this version, Pollux/Dougal was renamed Bobo (initially Peluche) and the show stuck with the idea of giving each character its own voice. Bobo was still referred to as English but did not have an accent.
 In Portugal, the series was known as "Carrossel Mágico" (spelled as "Carrocel Mágico"), and aired on RTP in 1966. The dub was based on the original French version (with the characters having their own voices), and several of the characters were renamed, with Pollux/Dougal being called "Franjinhas". It was also the first foreign children's series to be dubbed into European Portuguese.
 In Germany and in Austria it was translated to Das Zauberkarussell. Most of the characters are given different names, except for Dougal and Zebedee who retain their original French names (Pollux and Zebulon, respectively).
 In Austria there was in 1974/75 a special version in "Betthupferl" (the same as the German "Mr Sandman") called Gucki und seine Freunde (Cookie and his Friends), in which Cookie and his friend Apollonius always went through a hole in a tree to join the garden.
 In the United States, the series was called The Magic Carousel and it aired in the 1980s on Pinwheel, a programme on the children's channel Nickelodeon. This version used American actors such as Michael Karp (the voice of Dougal in this version) and was based on the original French incarnation, such as the scripts being word for word translations, and the characters having voices strikingly similar to the French dub's voices. Dylan and Mr. McHenry also retain their original French names (Flappy and Bonhomme Jouvence a.k.a. Mr. Young, respectively) with Mr Rusty having Mr. McHenry's name. Aside from that however, most of the characters have their names from the British version.
 In the Netherlands, a Dutch version was aired by the NTS (Dutch Television Foundation, one of the national broadcasters at the time) in black and white as 'De Minimolen' ('The Mini Carousel'). Starting on 5 June till 30 September 1967 the series aired on a six-day per week basis. The script in Dutch was written by Wim Meuldijk, at the time very successful in writing (and co-producing) the 'Pipo' children's series. A brief second run of 'De Minimolen' went on air in the late summer of 1980.

Theme tunes
The show's theme by Alain Legrand, was a cheerful organ tune. In the early black-and-white episodes, it was played more slowly with a degree of sadness. There were also two different additional theme songs for reruns of the original French version; the first, "C'est moi, Pollux" (1983), was a moderately popular single in France, while the theme from 1990 was an upbeat Hammond organ pop tune with children's vocals.

Film versions
Unlike the series, both films featured a villain in the Magic Roundabout canon.

Dougal and the Blue Cat

Danot made a longer film, Pollux et le chat bleu, in 1970 which was also adapted by Thompson and shown in Britain as Dougal and the Blue Cat. The story centers around Dougal, who becomes suspicious when a blue cat arrives at the Magic Garden. It turned out the cat, named Buxton, was working for an unseen voice (named the Blue Voice) of an abandoned factory, who wanted to take over the garden and turn everything into the colour blue. Upon this takeover, the residents of the garden also ended up being imprisoned, except for Dougal, who made a plan to rescue his friends. Among the film's many highlights, Buxton made a disguised Dougal face his ultimate weakness by locking him in a room full of sugar. The Blue Voice was voiced by Fenella Fielding and was the only time that Eric Thompson called in another person to voice a character.

2005 film

In 2005, a film adaptation (also called The Magic Roundabout) was released. The movie was about Dougal, Ermintrude, Brian and Dylan going on a quest to stop Zebadee's evil twin Zeebad, who intends on creating an eternal winter. It was made using modern computer animation, and adopted the approach of the original creator, Serge Danot, of giving each character its own voice rather than using a narrator. The voices included Tom Baker, Joanna Lumley, Ian McKellen, Jim Broadbent, Kylie Minogue, Robbie Williams, Bill Nighy and Lee Evans. The film received mixed reviews, with a 60% approval rating on Rotten Tomatoes, while Total Film ranked it as the 45th worst children's movie ever made. The two-disc special edition of the UK DVD of the film features five of the original Magic Roundabout episodes (including the English version of "Mr. Rusty Meets Zebedee", the very first episode from 1965) on the second disc. They are all presented in the original black and white with the option of viewing them in English or in the original French.

In 2006, the film was released in the U.S. as Doogal. The majority of original British voices were replaced by celebrities more familiar to the American public, such as Whoopi Goldberg and Chevy Chase. Only two original voices remained: those of Kylie Minogue and Ian McKellen. The final North American version was panned. As of September 2020, it had an 8% approval rating on Rotten Tomatoes. It received a score of 23 out of 100 ("generally unfavorable") on Metacritic, and an F rating from Entertainment Weekly magazine. It was also a financial failure, grossing a total of 7.2 million dollars in the United States, which is considered low by CGI animated film standards.

2007 continuation as a TV series 
In 2007, a new TV version of The Magic Roundabout was created, with 52 x 11-minute episodes. The series was produced by Action Synthese, Films Action, Ellipsanime and Play Production with the participation of M6, Nickelodeon UK and Disney Television France. The scripts and voices were produced in the UK. The show was directed by Graham Ralph of Silver Fox Films and produced by Theresa Plummer Andrews.

Using the CGI designed versions of the original characters from the 2005 movie also produced by Action Synthese, the only new characters taken from the film are Mr. Grimsdale the baker and Soldier Sam. The series takes place after the events of the 2005 film of the same name. The new series also created a few original characters of its own such as Fly and Dougal's Auntie Primrose.

Every episode would begin with Zebedee giving a brief summary to the audience of what will happen, before the plot begins. The episodes would also end with Zebedee throwing a party after the problems have been solved, with Dylan droopily remarking, "I wish it was time for bed, man..." (in reference to the original series' quote "Time for bed") before drifting off to sleep.

The series was first broadcast in the UK from 22 October 2007 at 8.00 am on satellite channel Nick Jr. It was also broadcast on the children's channel of China Central Television (CCTV-14) in Chinese during 2017 and was briefly available on Netflix in the US.

In October 2008, a Double DVD Bumper Pack Boxset of the 2007 reboot was released from Abbey Home Media, called Dougal's Darling and The Wishing Tree. It featured 12 Season 1 episodes, all of which are in order except for the two titular episodes.

In 2010, a second season of 52 11-minute episodes was created. This season included ZDF as an additional participator.

Parodies
In 1975, Jasper Carrott released "The Magic Roundabout" (originally featured on his first live LP Jasper Carrot – In the Club), a short, risqué comic monologue, parodying the children's TV series, as the B-side of a 7-inch single, featuring his comic song "Funky Moped" on the A-side. The record was a hit, reaching number 5 in the UK Singles Chart. The show's theme music also featured on two minor UK hit singles in 1991, "Summer's Magic" by Mark Summers and "Magic Style" by The Badman.

Records
In 1971, BBC Records released The Magic Roundabout (RBT 8), an LP containing 10 stories taken from the soundtracks of the TV series as told by Eric Thompson. The stories were: "Dougal's Experiment", "A Starry Night", "The Moody Concerto", "Dougal's Adventure", and "The Stiff Necked Heliotropes" on side one and "The Birds School", "The Piano Carrier", "Banana Skin", "The Musical Box", and "The Announcer" on side two. This album has been re-released twice on CD by the BBC, first in 2005 (BBC Audio:Children's) to coincide with the 'new' film and again in 2010 (Vintage Beeb), featuring the original LP artwork and a bonus interview with Eric Thompson.

French soundtrack recordings were also issued in France in the 1960s on three EPs and again on an LP Pollux in 1983, along with an original single "C'est moi Pollux".

Home releases

Between 1993 and 1997, two videos of the re-narrated version have been released by PolyGram Video.

In 1999, the original film Dougal and the Blue Cat has released on video by Second Sight Television.

Apart from the original film Dougal and the Blue Cat, the series has yet to receive any standalone release on DVD, but five of the original black-and-white episodes, including the series premiere, "Mr. Rusty Meets Zebedee", have been included as a bonus on the second disc of the UK Special Edition DVD of the 2005 CGI film. The other episodes included are "Camping", "Perfume", "Jumping Beans", and "Rocking Chair" from March 1967. Except for the series premiere, those four episodes also feature their original French versions with English subtitles.

Between 2008 and 2010, five DVDs of the 2007 reboot series have been released by Abbey Home Media.

In popular culture
 
 Giant versions of Dougal and Zebedee, both the size of a small house, are featured in The Goodies episode "The Goodies Rule – O.K.?" Dougal also makes a brief appearance in another Goodies episode, "It Might as Well Be String".
 The title and characters appeared as a regular weekly feature in the "Jack and Jill" children's comic. In Playhour Gordon Hutchings drew a comic strip based on The Magic Roundabout.
 No. 8 Squadron RAF nicknamed their Avro Shackleton early warning aircraft after characters from the show as well as characters from The Herbs.

References

External links
 Website about the show via Archive.org
 

1960s British children's television series
1970s British children's television series
1990s British children's television series
1965 British television series debuts
1992 British television series endings
Australian Broadcasting Corporation original programming
BBC children's television shows
British computer-animated television series
British children's animated adventure television series
British children's animated comedy television series
British children's animated fantasy television series
Channel 4 original programming
Television shows adapted into films
Television shows adapted into comics
Nickelodeon original programming
British parody television series
British stop-motion animated television series
English-language television shows